The 2014 FEI World Cup Finals in Lyon was held between April 17 and April 21, 2014. It was the final of the Show jumping and Dressage World Cup series. The finals were held in the Lyon Euroexpo. For the first time since 1987, the Show Jumping World Cup Final was held in France while the Dressage World Cup Final had not been held in France since 1991.

Dressage

Qualification 

* Extra competitor (a rider representing a country which is not affiliated to the World Cup League. The rider competes in qualifying rounds in their own country. At the end of the season the rider's score is deducted from the qualifying scores of this league. If they have just as many or more points as the lowest qualified rider, they have the chance to start at the World Cup Final)
** Qualified on reallocation
*** Qualified as an extra athlete after Anna Kasprzak withdrew

Agenda and results

Grand Prix 
On April 19, 2014 (15:00) the Grand Prix was held. It was the first competition of the Dressage World Cup final, but it did not count for the final ranking. Every rider competing in the Grand Prix qualified for the Grand Prix Freestyle. Denmark's Nanna Skodborg Merrald was scheduled to compete, but had to withdraw after her horse failed to pass the veterinary test.

Result:

Grand Prix Freestyle 
The second competition of the Dressage World Cup final was the Grand Prix Freestyle, held on the afternoon of Sunday, April 21. Charlotte Dujardin won her first World Cup title with Valegro. Dujardin also set the new highest winning score, becoming the first rider to score above 90% at the World Cup final.
Result:

Show jumping

Qualification 

* Extra competitor (a rider representing a country which is not affiliated to the World Cup League. The rider competes in qualifying rounds in their own country. At the end of the season the rider's score is deducted from the qualifying scores of this league. If they have just as many or more points as the lowest qualified rider, they have the chance to start at the World Cup Final)
** Qualified on reallocation

Agenda and results

World Cup

Final I 
The first competition of the Show Jumping World Cup Final, a speed and handiness competition, was held at Friday evening (April 18, 2014). The results of this competition were converted into faults for the World Cup Final standings.

Result:

(Top 10 of 40 competitors)

Last year final winner Beezie Madden had one obstacle fault in the speed and handiness competition, so she had a result of 68.55 seconds and was placed 12th after the first round.

Final II 
On the April 19 evening the second competition of the Show Jumping World Cup Final was held, a show jumping competition with one jump-off. After the second round, the World Cup Points were converted in Penalties for the Final Round.

Results:

(Top Ten of 38 competitors)

External links 
 Website of the 2014 FEI World Cup Finals (French / English)

References 

2014 in equestrian
Dressage World Cup
Show Jumping World Cup
2014 in French sport
Sports competitions in Lyon
April 2014 sports events in Europe
21st century in Lyon
Equestrian sports competitions in France
International sports competitions hosted by France